Lejon is a Swedish language surname from the Swedish word for lion. Notable people with the name include:
 Britta Lejon (1964), Swedish Social Democratic politician
 Marika Lejon (1984), Norwegian composer and singer

References

Swedish-language surnames
Surnames from nicknames